Richmond District may refer to:

Richmond District, San Francisco, a neighborhood in the city of San Francisco
Richmond District, Pennsylvania, a former area of the city of Philadelphia